Soltan Mohammad-e Taher (also Romanized as Solţān Moḩammad-e Ţāher; also known as Emāmzādeh Solţān Moḩammad-e Ţāher) is a village in Feyziyeh Rural District, in the Central District of Babol County, Mazandaran Province, Iran. At the 2006 census, its population was 1,352, in 369 families.

References 

Populated places in Babol County